The 11th Central Committee of the Communist Party of Vietnam was elected at the 11th National Congress of the Communist Party of Vietnam. The 11th Central Committee elected the 11th Politburo and the 11th Secretariat.

Plenums
The Central Committee is not a permanent institution. Instead, it convenes plenary sessions between party congresses. When the CC is not in session, decision-making powers are delegated to the internal bodies of the CC itself; that is, the Politburo and the Secretariat. None of these organs are permanent bodies either; typically, they convene several times a month.

Composition

Members

Alternates

References

External links
  

11th Central Committee of the Communist Party of Vietnam